Women in Bondage is a 1943 World War II film about conditions for women under Hitler's regime directed by Steve Sekely and starring Gail Patrick and Nancy Kelly. The plot involves two women imprisoned for speaking out against the government.

Cast
Gail Patrick as Margot Bracken
Nancy Kelly as Toni Hall
William Henry as Heinz Radtke (as Bill Henry)
Tala Birell as Ruth Bracken
Gertrude Michael as District Director Schneider
Alan Baxter as Otto Bracken
Maris Wrixon as Grete Ziegler
Rita Quigley as Herta Rumann
Felix Basch as Dr. Mensch
H.B. Warner as Pastor Renz
Anne Nagel as Deputy District Director
Mary Forbes as Gladys Bracken
Roland Varno as Ernest Bracken

Reception
The film was one of the most successful in the history of Monogram.

References

External links 
 
 
 

1943 films
World War II films made in wartime
Monogram Pictures films
American black-and-white films
Films directed by Steve Sekely
Sterilization in fiction
Films about Nazi Germany
American war drama films
1940s war drama films
1943 drama films
1940s English-language films